The Democratic Union is a political party in Morocco.

History and profile
The party was founded by Buazza Ikken in November 2001.

At the last legislative elections, held on 27 September 2002, the party won ten out of 325 seats.

References

2001 establishments in Morocco
Political parties established in 2001
Political parties in Morocco